The Bartlesville Pirates were a minor league baseball team, based in Bartlesville, Oklahoma from 1948 to 1952. During that time, the club was a member of the Kansas-Oklahoma-Missouri League and a class-D affiliate of the Pittsburgh Pirates. On July 7, 1952, the team relocated to Pittsburg, Kansas to finish the season.

Season-by-season

* Team moved to Pittsburg, Kansas on July 7, 1952

Defunct minor league baseball teams
Pittsburgh Pirates minor league affiliates
Professional baseball teams in Oklahoma
Baseball teams established in 1948
Baseball teams disestablished in 1952
1948 establishments in Oklahoma
1952 disestablishments in Oklahoma
Defunct baseball teams in Oklahoma